Mahan District (Baxš-e Māhān) is a district (bakhsh) in Kerman County, Kerman Province, Iran. At the 2006 census, its population was 29,923, in 7,607 families.  The district has three cities: Mahan, Jupar, and Mohiabad. The district has two rural districts (dehestan): Mahan Rural District and Qanatghestan Rural District.

References 

Kerman County
Districts of Kerman Province